Bucculatrix ambrosiaefoliella is a species of moth in the family Bucculatricidae. It is found in North America, where it has been recorded from California, Texas, Arizona, Pennsylvania, Kentucky, Missouri, Iowa, Maine and Ohio. The species was first described by Vactor Tousey Chambers in 1875.

The wingspan is 7.5–8 mm. The forewings are densely overlaid with ocherous, ocherous brown-tipped and dark brown scales, completely obscuring the whitish ground color. The hindwings are reddish grey-brown. Adults are on wing from late summer to October. The species probably overwinters as an adult.

The larvae feed on Ambrosia and Helianthus species and Parthenium hysterophorus. They mine the leaves of their host plant. The mine starts as a short, tortuous, linear mine ending in a small blotch. The frass is deposited in compact lines. Older larvae leave the mine and feed freely on the leaf. Pupation takes place in a white, slender cocoon.

References

Natural History Museum Lepidoptera generic names catalog

Bucculatricidae
Leaf miners
Moths described in 1875
Moths of North America